Kristrún Mjöll Frostadóttir (born 12 May 1988) is an Icelandic economist and member of parliament, as well as chairwoman for the Social Democratic Alliance. She was born in Reykjavík.
Kristrún graduated from Boston University with a master's degree in economics.

She is the former main economist for the bank Kvika banki and a specialist for Morgan Stanley. She has worked as a journalist for the business newspaper Viðskiptablaðið.

In 2021 she was elected into the parliament Alþingi for the Social Democratic Alliance and in 2022 she sought to be chairwomen of the same party.

References

External links
The page in Althingi.is for Kristrún Frostadóttir

1988 births
Living people
Kristrun Frostadottir
Kristrun Frostadottir
Social Democratic Alliance